High-speed rail (HSR) has developed in Europe as an increasingly popular and efficient means of transport. The first high-speed rail lines on the continent, built in the 1970s, 1980s, and 1990s, improved travel times on intra-national corridors. Since then, several countries have built extensive high-speed networks, and there are now several cross-border high-speed rail links. Railway operators frequently run international services, and tracks are continuously being built and upgraded to international standards on the emerging European high-speed rail network.

In 2007, a consortium of European Railway operators, Railteam, emerged to co-ordinate and boost cross-border high-speed rail travel. Developing a Trans-European high-speed rail network is a stated goal of the European Union, and most cross-border railway lines receive EU funding. Several countries — France, Spain, Italy, Germany, Austria, Sweden, Belgium, the Netherlands, Poland, Portugal, Russia and the United Kingdom — are connected to a cross-border high-speed railway network.

More are expected to be connected in the coming years as Europe invests heavily in tunnels, bridges and other infrastructure and development projects across the continent, many of which are under construction now. Alstom was the first manufacturer to design and deliver a high speed train or HS-Train, which ended up in service with TGV in France.

Currently, there are a number of manufacturers designing and building HSR in Europe, with criss-crossed alliances and partnerships, including Alstom, Bombardier (since 2021 owned by Alstom), Hitachi, Siemens, and Talgo.

Early national high-speed rail networks
The first high-speed rail lines and services were built in the 1980s and 1990s as national projects. Countries sought to increase passenger capacity and decrease journey times on inter-city routes within their borders. In the beginning, lines were built through national funding programs and services were operated by national operators.

France

France was the first country to introduce high-speed rail in Europe when the LGV Sud-Est from Paris to Lyon opened in 1981 and TGV started passenger service. Since then, France has continued to build an extensive network, with lines extending in every direction from Paris.

The TGV network gradually spread out to other cities, and into other countries such as Switzerland, Belgium, the Netherlands, Germany, and the UK. Due to the early adoption of high-speed rail and the important location of France (between the Iberian Peninsula, the British Isles and Central Europe), most other dedicated high-speed rail lines in Europe have been built to the same speed, voltage and signaling standards. The most obvious exception is the high-speed lines in Germany, which are built to existing German railway standards. Also, many high-speed services, including TGV and ICE utilize existing rail lines in addition to those designed for high-speed rail. For that reason, and due to differing national standards, trains that cross national boundaries need to have special characteristics, such as the ability to handle different power supplies and signalling systems. This means that not all TGVs are the same, and there are loading gauge and signalling considerations.

United Kingdom

Early developments

Britain has a history of high-speed rail, starting with early high-speed steam systems: examples of engines are GWR 3700 Class 3440 City of Truro and the steam-record holder LNER Class A4 4468 Mallard. Later, high-speed diesel and electric services were introduced, using upgraded main lines, mainly the Great Western Main Line (GWML) and East Coast Main Line.
The HST was diesel-powered, and the GWML was the first to be modified for the new service. The Intercity 125 had proven the economic case for high-speed rail, and British Rail was keen to explore further advances.

In the 1970s, British Rail began to explore new technologies for high-speed passenger rail services in the UK. An experimental version, the APT-E, was tested between 1972 and 1976. It was equipped with a tilting mechanism which allowed the train to tilt into bends to reduce cornering forces on passengers, and was powered by gas turbines (the first to be used on British Rail since the Great Western Railway). The line had used Swiss-built Brown-Boveri and British-built Metropolitan-Vickers locomotives (18000 and 18100) in the early 1950s. The 1970s oil crisis prompted a rethink in the choice of motive power (as with the prototype TGV in France), and British Rail later opted for traditional electric overhead lines when the pre-production and production APTs were brought into service in 1980–86. 

Initial experience with the Advanced Passenger Trains was pretty good. They had a high power-to-weight ratio to enable rapid acceleration; the prototype set record speeds on the Great Western Main Line and the Midland Main Line, and the production versions vastly reduced journey times on the WCML. The APT was, however, beset with technical problems; financial constraints and negative media coverage eventually caused the project to be cancelled.

Current network and projects

New dedicated high-speed lines have an operating speed of more than :
It opened on 14 November 2007, on time and under budget.
 A second line, High Speed 2 (HS2), has been under construction since 2019 between London and Birmingham with later extensions to Manchester and East Midlands Parkway, Leicestershire. HS2 is a more sustainable high-speed line critical for the UK's low carbon transport future, building several new railway stations and bridges. Government-backed plans to provide east-west high-speed services between cities in the North of England are also in stages of development, as part of the Northern Powerhouse Rail project.
Like Finnish and Russian counterparts, the strongest reasons for new high-speed lines are to relieve congestion on the existing network and create extra capacity.

In order to carry passengers to destinations beyond the core routes to Paris and Brussels, new Class 374 trains, also referred to as the Eurostar e320, were introduced in November 2015. A Class 374 train has 900 seats, roughly equivalent to six Airbus A320s or Boeing 737s (the aircraft typically used by low-cost airlines).

Germany

Construction on first German high-speed lines began shortly after that of the French LGVs. Legal battles caused significant delays, so that the InterCityExpress (ICE) trains were deployed ten years after the TGV network was established. The ICE network is more tightly integrated with pre-existing lines and trains as a result of the different settlement structure in Germany, with a population more numerous by a third than that of France, on a territory smaller by a third, resulting in more than twice the population density of France. ICE trains reached destinations in Austria and Switzerland soon after they entered service, taking advantage of the same voltage used in these countries. Starting in 2000, multisystem third-generation ICE trains entered the Netherlands and Belgium.

Together with the fast lines from Berlin to Leipzig and from Nuremberg to Munich, which were completed in 2006, it allows journey times of about four hours from Berlin in the north to Munich in the south, compared to nearly eight hours for the same distance a few years ago.

Italy

The earliest high-speed rail line built in Europe was the Italian "Direttissima", the Florence–Rome high-speed railway  in 1978, which used FS Class E444 3 kV DC locomotives. Italy pioneered the use of the Pendolino tilting train technology. The Italian government constructor Treno Alta Velocità has been adding to the high-speed network in Italy, with some lines already opened. The Italian operator NTV is the first open access high-speed rail operator in Europe, since 2011, using AGV ETR 575 multiple units.

In March 2011, a contract for the second phase of construction on the Milan–Verona high-speed line was signed. Construction originally to be completed by 2015, it is open to Brescia since late 2016.

The safety system adopted for the network is the ERMTS/ETCS II, the state-of-the-art in railway signalling and safety. The power supply follows the European standard of 25 kV AC 50 Hz mono-phase current. The Direttissima segment is still supplied with 3 kV DC current, but it is planned that this will be conformed to the rest of the network.

The increasing success of Italy's high-speed rail networks since 2008 has been cited as one of the main reasons that the flag carrier airline Alitalia, which focused on domestic flights, went bankrupt and ceased operations in October 2021 as high-speed train travel became faster, cheaper and more efficient.

Spain

Early developments 

The AVE service 

The ambitious AVE construction programme aims to connect with high-speed trains almost all provincial capitals to Madrid in less than 3 hours and to Barcelona within 6 hours. With an initial deadline set for 2020, the programme was slowed down by the financial crisis: the two main lines still under construction, the Mediterranean Corridor and the Madrid–Extremadura line (which would be part of the Madrid-Lisbon link), are yet to be completed.

The first HSL from Madrid to Seville is equipped with the LZB train control system, and later lines with ETCS.

Elsewhere in Europe, the success of high-speed services has been due in part to interoperability with existing normal rail lines. Interoperability between the new AVE lines and the older Iberian gauge network presents additional challenges. Both Talgo and CAF supply trains with variable gauge wheels operated by automatic gauge-changer equipment which the trains pass through without stopping (Alvias). Some lines are being constructed as dual gauge to allow trains with Iberian and UIC gauge to run on the same tracks. Other lines have been re-equipped with sleepers for both Iberian and UIC gauge, such that the track can be converted from Iberian to UIC gauge at a later time without changing the sleepers.

The first AVE trains to link up with the French standard gauge network began running in December 2013, when direct high-speed rail services between Spain and France were launched for the first time. This connection between the two countries was made possible by the construction of the Perpignan–Barcelona high-speed rail line (a follow-up of the Madrid-Barcelona line), completed in January 2013, and its international section Perpignan-Figueres, which opened in December 2010 and includes a new  tunnel under the Pyrenees. Another high-speed rail link connecting the two countries at Irun/Hendaye is also planned.

Current network and projects 

Three companies have built or will build trains for the Spanish high-speed railway network: Spanish Talgo, French Alstom and German Siemens AG. Bombardier Transportation is a partner in both the Talgo-led and the Siemens-led consortium. France will eventually build 25 kV TGV lines all the way to the Spanish border (there is now a gap between Nîmes and Perpignan), but multi-voltage trains will still be needed, as trains travelling to Paris need to travel the last few kilometres on 1.5 kV lines. To this end, RENFE decided to convert 10 existing AVE S100 trains to operate at this voltage (as well as the French signalling systems), which will cost €30,000,000 instead of the previously expected €270,000,000 for new trains.

The network eventually opened to operators other than RENFE, and the SNCF-owned low-cost brand Ouigo España began to serve the Madrid–Barcelona route on 10 May 2021. To complement their higher-end AVE trains, RENFE launched a no-frills service called Avlo on 23 June 2021. Iryo, operated by the ILSA joint venture between Air Nostrum and Trenitalia, began operation in late 2022, making Spain the first country in Europe with three competing operators of high-speed trains.

Integration of European high-speed rail network
The Trans-European high-speed rail network is one of a number of the European Union's Trans-European transport networks. It was defined by the Council Directive 96/48/EC of 23 July 1996.

The aim of this EU Directive is to achieve the interoperability of the European high-speed train network at the various stages of its design, construction and operation.

The network is defined as a system consisting of a set of infrastructures, fixed installations, logistic equipment and rolling stock.

On 5 June 2010, the European Commissioner for Transport signed a Memorandum of Understanding with France and Spain concerning a new high-speed rail line across the Pyrenees to become the first link between the high-speed lines of the two countries. Furthermore, high-speed lines between Helsinki and Berlin (Rail Baltica), and between Lyon and Budapest, were promoted.

Cross-border infrastructure and passenger services

Belgium

Belgium's rail network is served by four high-speed train operators: Thalys, Eurostar, ICE and TGV trains. All of them serve Brussels South station, Belgium's largest railway station. Thalys trains, which are a variant of the French TGV, operate between Belgium, Germany (Dortmund), the Netherlands (Amsterdam) and France (Paris). Since 2007, Eurostar has connected Brussels to London St Pancras, before which, trains connected to London Waterloo. The German ICE operates between Brussels, Liège and Frankfurt.

The HSL 1 is a Belgian high-speed railway line which connects Brussels with the French border.  long ( dedicated high-speed tracks,  modernised lines), it began service on 14 December 1997. The line has appreciably shortened rail journeys, the journey from Paris to Brussels now taking 1:22. In combination with the LGV Nord, it has also affected international journeys to France and London, ensuring high-speed through-running by Eurostar, TGV, Thalys PBA and Thalys PBKA trainsets. The total construction cost was €1.42 billion.

Its extension to the German border (the HSL 3) is now in use, the combined high-speed line greatly accelerates journeys between Brussels, Paris and Germany. HSL 2 is used by Thalys and ICE trains as well as fast internal InterCity services.

The HSL 3 is a Belgian high-speed railway line which connects Liège to the German border.  long ( dedicated high-speed tracks,  modernised lines), it began service on 13 December 2009. HSL 3 is used by international Thalys and ICE trains only, as opposed to HSL 2 which is also used for fast internal InterCity services.

The HSL 4 is a Belgian high-speed railway line which connects Brussels to the Dutch border.  long ( dedicated high-speed tracks,  modernised lines). HSL 4 is used by Thalys trains since 13 December 2009 and it will be used starting 2010 by fast internal InterCity trains.

The completion of the Channel Tunnel rail link (High Speed 1) and the completion of the lines from Brussels to Amsterdam and Cologne led to news reports in November 2007 that both Eurostar and Deutsche Bahn were pursuing direct services from London to Amsterdam and Cologne. Both journeys would be under 4 hours, the length generally considered competitive with air travel.

It's unknown when it will happen.

Netherlands

Using existing tracks from Amsterdam Centraal to Schiphol Airport, the dedicated high-speed line begins here and continues to Rotterdam Centraal and to the Belgian border. Here, it connects to the HSL 4, terminating at Antwerpen-Centraal. Den Haag Centraal (The Hague) and Breda are connected to the high-speed line by conventional railway lines. Services on the HSL-Zuid began on 7 September 2009. It is being served by Thalys trains from Amsterdam to Brussels and Paris, Eurostar trains to Brussels and London and domestic Intercity Direct train services.

HSL-Oost was planned, but was put on hiatus. It would connect Amsterdam Centraal via Utrecht Centraal and Arnhem to Germany. The existing line from Amsterdam to Utrecht is four-tracked. The line is planned to be re-electrified to 25 kV AC.

This line would, along with other measures on the Amsterdam - Copenhagen corridor, allow to reduce the traveling time between these two cities down to 4h 30mn.

Paris to Frankfurt
Admission of ICE trains onto French LGVs was applied for in 2001, and trial runs were completed in 2005. In June 2007, the LGV Est from Paris to the middle of the Lorraine region of France was opened. For the first time, high-speed services over the Franco-German border were offered. SNCF operates the TGV service between Paris and Stuttgart via Strasbourg and a daily return journey from Paris to Frankfurt via Saarbrücken, while ICE trains operate the remaining Paris to Frankfurt.

Frankfurt to Marseille
After the inauguration of the LGV Rhin-Rhône in 2011 a daily high-speed TGV service has been introduced between Frankfurt Hbf and Marseille St. Charles via Strasbourg, Mulhouse, Lyon and Valence with a total travel time under 8h.

Channel Tunnel
The construction of the Channel Tunnel, completed in 1994, provided the impetus for the first cross-border high-speed rail line. In 1993, the LGV Nord, which connects Paris to the Belgian border and the Channel Tunnel via Lille, was opened. Initial travel times through the tunnel from London to Paris and Brussels were about 3 hours. In 1997, a dedicated high-speed line to Brussels, HSL 1, was opened. In 2007, High Speed 1, the Channel Tunnel Rail Link to London, was completed after a partial opening in 2003. All three lines were built to the French LGV standards, including electrification at 25 kV. In 1990s it was claimed that such speed restriction is temporary.

London to Paris and Brussels
Passenger trains built to specific safety standards are operated by Eurostar through the Channel Tunnel. Direct trains now travel from London St Pancras to Paris in 2h15, and to Brussels in 1h51. On 1 May 2015 Eurostar introduced a weekly service from London to Lyon, Avignon and Marseille. Thalys high-speed international trains serve the Paris to Brussels corridor, which is now covered in 1h20. Additional Thalys services extend to Amsterdam and Cologne in addition to Belgian cities.

London to Amsterdam and Germany
Both Deutsche Bahn (DB) and Eurostar have announced plans for direct services from London to new continental destinations in the Netherlands and Germany. DB have not set a date for any new service to begin, although the company did at one point hope to introduce a five-hour service to Frankfurt by 2017. A four times daily direct Eurostar service between London St Pancras and Amsterdam started running on 4 April 2018. The German manufacturer Siemens has designed trainsets to meet the strict safety standards of Channel Tunnel operation.

Spanish-French border
A  section of the Perpignan–Barcelona high-speed rail line across the Spanish-French border opened in January 2013. The line includes the new  Perthus Tunnel under the Pyrenees and permits high-speed rail services between Spain and France. Since 15 December 2013 the French SNCF operates a TGV service between Paris and Barcelona and the Spanish AVE offers direct Madrid–Marseille, Barcelona–Lyon and Barcelona–Toulouse high-speed services. The journey time for the TGV Paris–Barcelona service is now 6h 25min. A 60 kilometer Nîmes–Montpellier bypass is under construction and will chop 20 minutes off travel times from Barcelona to Lyon and beyond. There is on the other hand currently no funding for the missing segment of high-speed line between Montpellier and Perpignan, which would cut journey times between the two countries by an additional hour.

Another high-speed rail link connecting the two countries is planned via Irun/Hendaye, but is not currently funded.

Crossing the Alps
The north–south axis has been improved by the Swiss NRLA project already in 2007 with the Lötschberg Base Tunnel and in 2016 with the currently world's longest railway tunnel, the Gotthard Base Tunnel.

Further international links between Italy and France, Switzerland, Austria and Slovenia are under way. These links all incorporate extensive new tunnelling under the Alps. European Union funding has already been approved for the Turin–Lyon high-speed railway, which will connect the TGV and TAV networks, and for a link with Slovenia. In Slovenia, Pendolino-based trainsets are operated by Slovenian Railways as the InterCitySlovenija. Trains connect the capital Ljubljana with Maribor and also with Koper in the summer months. One unit operated as EC Casanova on the line Ljubljana–Venice, but this service was discontinued in April 2008.

Between Austria and Italy, the Brenner Base Tunnel is being constructed to upgrade the Berlin–Palermo railway axis.

Future projects adjacent to existing high-speed services

Magistrale for Europe

The Magistrale for Europe (MoE) is an initiative to promote railway expansion between Paris and Bratislava/Budapest, passing Strasbourg and Munich. Founded in 1990, the initiative is supported by numerous cities and regions along the line. Several railway projects, such as the LGV Est and Rastatt tunnel, have been promoted through the initiative.

Austria

The Western Railway between the capital Vienna and Salzburg is being upgraded.

The section is also part of the Berlin–Palermo railway axis.

The Koralm Railway, the first entirely new railway line in the Second Austrian Republic has been under construction since 2006. It includes a new  tunnel (the Koralm Tunnel) connecting the cities of Klagenfurt and Graz. The time taken to travel from Klagenfurt to Graz will be reduced from three hours to one hour. The Koralmbahn is expected to be operational by 2025.

Switzerland

The fastest Swiss train is the SBB RABe 501 also named Giruno. It is operated by the Swiss Federal Railways since May 2016. They can reach higher speeds than conventional trains on the curve-intensive Swiss network, however the top speed of  can only be reached on high-speed lines. The former Cisalpino consortium owned by the Swiss Federal Railways and Trenitalia used Pendolino tilting trains on two of its international lines. These trains are now operated by the Swiss Federal Railways and Trenitalia.

To address transalpine freight and passenger bottlenecks on its roads and railways, Switzerland launched the Rail2000 and NRLA projects.

Nordic countries

Denmark

Most parts of the rail network are unelectrified – thus slowing acceleration and top speed. Since 2007 it has been common practice for the infrastructure provider Banedanmark to pad the timetables with extra time to a near European record, resulting in railway companies which only utilize the top speeds to make up for lost time.
Some of the rolling stock running on the Danish rail network are capable of reaching , the SJ 2000 and the IC4 (the IC4 is only allowed up to 180 km/h or 112 mph in regular operation).

Denmark's unique signalling system, which contains numerous obsolete components, is being replaced with a new one, the ERTMS 2, to be finished in 2030.

A new  Copenhagen–Ringsted Line was completed in 2019. Once this project is finished, Denmark would be able to link the Swedish high-speed lines with the rest of the European high-speed rail network.

In 2013 the Danish Government (consisting of the parties: the Social Democrats, the Danish Social Liberal Party and the Socialist People's Party) along with the supporting party Red–Green Alliance and the opposition party Danish People's Party entered an ambitious political agreement on the infrastructure project called "The Train Fund DK". The main component of the agreement is to raise taxes on the oil companies operating in the Danish parts of the North Sea in order to raise 2,8 billion pounds earmarked for railway upgrades. The first priority is to reduce the travelling time between Denmark's two biggest cities, Copenhagen and Aarhus to two hours. Furthermore, all main lines and many regional lines will be electrified.

Finland

In Finland the national railway company VR operates tilting Alstom Pendolino trains. This portion of track was opened in 2006. Other parts of the Finnish railway network are limited to lower speed.

Between 2007 and 2010 the Russian line from the Finnish border to Saint Petersburg was electrified and improved to allow higher running speeds. In 2010, a new service called Allegro started between Helsinki and Saint Petersburg, using the improved network. The service has a journey time of 3½ hours. It utilizes a new Pendolino model, supporting both Finnish and Russian standards. As of 2022, the service is on hold, a consequence of the 2022 Russian invasion of Ukraine.

Iceland
As of 2022, the project had not advanced beyond the proposal stage.

Norway

Norway has several high speed stretches radiating from Oslo. Several new railroad stretches are under construction and the complete Intercity triangle from Oslo will be finished by 2030.

Norway's only high-speed line is the  Gardermobanen (The Gardermoen Railway), which links Oslo Airport (OSL) with the metropolitan areas of Oslo. Gardermobanen contributes to give rail transport a relatively high market share. Almost 38% of the OSL passengers come by train, about 21% by bus, and about 40% by car.

Some more new high-speed lines are planned to be built in the Oslo region, during the 2010 and 2020 decades.

There is a political climate for building more high-speed railway services in Norway, including long-distance lines from Oslo to Trondheim, Bergen, Stavanger and Gothenburg. This is still at the feasibility planning stages.

The Norwegian government is examining five lines radiating out from Oslo to Bergen, Kristiansand/Stavanger, Trondheim, Göteborg, and Stockholm. A sixth line would be a coastal line between Bergen, Haugesund and Stavanger. At least two investigations on cost and benefit have been made. A more indepth analysis covering route analysis of the 6 lines will be made on order by the Norwegian government beginning late 2010.

The closest  from Oslo on each of these lines have good potential for regional trains (except towards Stockholm). Upgrade and new construction to high-speed standard have to some extent already taken place like for Gardermobanen. More is being built and is planned, but with the present ambition it will take decades to have high-speed standard the closest  from Oslo on all these lines. The ambition is to some day have  or more to Halden, Skien, Hønefoss and Hamar. These projects have higher priority than the long-distance projects. They are also preconditions for the long-distance projects, since they will be used by long-distance trains.

Parts of the new built route Drammen – Tønsberg is in operation with trains (Stadler FLIRT) capable of 200 km/h.

Sweden

This requires new signalling system, new trains and perhaps other minor efforts. The old main lines are difficult to upgrade due costs for increasing the bearing of the track. Most bridges and long sections of the main lines need to be rebuilt to allow .

The plan is to ease the situation on the existing railways that are relatively congested, combined with better travel times between both the largest three cities in Sweden, as well as fast regional trains between the cities along the routes (which today in many cases have no or slow railways).

An informal date suggestion by the Banverket is operation by year 2030. For two parts (Södertälje–Linköping and Mölnlycke–Bollebygd) detailed planning is done, and they are expected to have construction start by around 2017 and be in operation by around 2025.

ERTMS level 2 has been installed and is being tried out on Botniabanan, and that railway allows , although no passenger train goes above  for now. The train set X55-Regina has been delivered to the rail company SJ with the max speed of  but with the option to upgrade the EMU to  when possible. These trains haven't got increased speed as of 2022, but SJ has in 2022 ordered new Zefiro trains which shall be able to go in 250 kph. Also the mix with freight trains slow down the practical speed.

 Ostlänken: Järna – Linköping, which would relieve the congested and slow conventional main lines on the stretch Järna-Linköping, Södra stambanan.
 Götalandsbanan: Gothenburg – Borås – Jönköping – Linköping, connecting to Ostlänken. It would reduce travel time Gothenburg-Stockholm from 3.05 h to 2h, and much improve some regional travel times.
 Europabanan: Jönköping – Hässleholm and Helsingborg. The discussed extension to Helsingør (Tunnel under Øresund) and Copenhagen, is now (2016) unlikely due to Danish resistance. 
 Hässleholm–Lund. The existing is fairly fast at around 160 kph, but congested with mix of local and high-speed trains. A new parallel high-speed railway between these cities is planned in detail.
The three first listed and the last, but not Europabanan, have been prospected by Trafikverket. In several cases the detailed alignment have been decided.
The Swedish Conservative government 2006–2014 showed little interest in major railway projects. But the socialist/environmentalist government has from 2014 started further negotiations on stations and other alignment. There is plan to start building Gothenburg – Borås and Ostlänken in 2019. The other railways are expected to be built some years after. As of 2022 there is no decision. A problem is that cost has been increasing a lot.

South-east

Turkey

Turkey started building high-speed rail lines in 2003 aiming a double-track high-speed rail network through the country allowing a maximum speed of  Only the planned line between İstanbul, Edirne and Kapıkule is situated in the European part of the country.

The first line that was built aimed to connect İstanbul to Ankara (via Eskişehir) reducing the travel time from 6 – 7 hours to 3 hours 10 minutes. The Eskişehir-İstanbul line is still under construction and was due in 2015.

The Ankara – Konya line construction began in 2006. The travel time is projected to be decreased to 70 minutes on this route. The construction of the Ankara – Kırıkkale – Yozgat – Sivas line began in February 2009. Several other HSR line projects between major cities such as Ankara – Afyon – Uşak – İzmir, İstanbul – Bursa, İstanbul – Edirne – Kapıkule (Bulgarian border) have reached their final design and are expected to pass to the contraction phase soon. Ankara – Kayseri and Eskişehir – Afyon – Antalya lines are planned to be built in the coming years. The Konya – Mersin – Adana and Sivas – Erzincan – Erzurum – Kars lines were mentioned by the prime minister and the minister of transport.

The first 12 high-speed trainsets are ordered from CAF company, Spain. Several new trainsets from Siemens were also bought for the Ankara-Konya line.

Greece

Development of a modern rail network for Greece has been a major goal since the 1990s. In 1996, construction of what is currently known as the P.A.Th.E./P. was given the go-ahead. The line, which should have opened by 2004, will link Patras, Athens, Thessaloniki and the Greece–North Macedonia and Greece–Bulgaria borders in Idomeni and Promachonas respectively. The project faced lack of funding and construction difficulties. The Athens-Thessaloniki section has been finished, allowing a travel time of 3 hours 20 minutes, a reduction of three hours.

Hungary and Romania
November 2007, the two countries agreed to build a high-speed line between their capital cities Budapest and Bucharest which would be a part of a larger transportation corridor Paris-Vienna-Budapest-Bucharest-Constanța. The plan for a high-speed railway through Budapest-Arad-Sibiu-Brașov-Bucharest-Constanța was officially included in the revised TEN-T plan in October 2013 as part of the Rhine-Danube Corridor. In 2022, the Romanian Ministry of Transport and Infrastructure announced a 120 million euros feasibility study for the construction of a high-speed line connecting Bucharest to Constanța and the Port of Constanța, as well as a line to Budapest, making use of the European Union Recovery Instrument following the COVID-19 pandemic. The study is planned to be finished by 2026. Two variants of the line to Hungary are studied, including one through the Olt river Valley, passing Sibiu, Cluj and Oradea with a length of 590 kilometres and an estimated cost of 17 billion euros. The second variant is a hybrid approach, which includes sections of lower speeds taking into account geographical aspects and economic profitability.

Hungary and Serbia

The construction of the railway line in Serbia started in September 2017, when the construction of the Čortanovci tunnel began. The construction of the  section between Novi Sad and Subotica (Hungarian border) was started on 7 April 2022 and is due to be completed for the end of 2024.

The construction of the Hungarian part of the railway, was started in October 2021 and is due to be completed by 2025. When the project is complete, the journey between Budapest and Belgrade should be reduced to 2h 40mn according to some sources and to 3h 30mn according to some others.

Serbia 
After the realisation of a high speed line between Belgrade and Novi Sad, additional high speed connections within Serbia are planned as well as the modernisation of branch lines which will connect the main high speed line Subotica-Niš with neighbouring countries like North Macedonia and Bulgaria.

Other high-speed projects
Several other countries in Europe have launched or planned high-speed rail programmes. Due to geographic challenges, these projects are likely to remain national in scope for the foreseeable future, without international links to existing high-speed networks.

Belarus
In 2017 Belarus authorities agreed to offer land territories to Chinese corporation CRCC for construction of a high-speed corridor between the EU and Russia through country territory. Chinese engineering companies are also interested in building highways and Russian high-speed railways running in connection with this route with possible interchange with the Moscow-Kazan high-speed corridor.

The Baltics
A north/south Rail Baltica line from Tallinn to Kaunas is planned to be constructed starting in 2019 and in service by 2026. The line would connect Tallinn and Kaunas via Pärnu, Riga and Panevėžys, while also providing connections to airports and railway terminals. The railway will be the first high-speed, 1435mm standard gauge railway in the Baltics. From Kaunas, it will be connected to the already existing high-speed network in Poland. About 80% of construction costs (totalling ca. 5 billion €) will be covered by the European Union, the rest will be paid jointly by the Estonian, Latvian and Lithuanian governments. Indirectly the railway may also link Helsinki, as there are plans for a Tallinn-Helsinki railway tunnel.

The project has been surrounded with controversy in all states, mainly due to environmental concerns and the cost of the project. According to surveys conducted to Estonia, public support remains around 60%, with the percent higher amongst people living in Tallinn and amongst people with higher education, while the percent drops in rural areas. Controversy has also surrounded the choice of route, with some proposing that the railway should also go through Tartu and Vilnius. However this has been dismissed as they are large detours, would increase the cost and bring no sufficient benefit.

Croatia

With the highway construction programme in its final stages, the Croatian parliament has passed a bill to build its first high-speed line, a new Botovo–Zagreb–Rijeka line, with an initial maximum planned speed of 250 km/h.

Czech Republic

Czech Railways have been running the Super City Pendolino from Prague to Ostrava since 2005.

Several studies of a possible network have been completed, but there have not yet been any concrete proposals. There are no expectations for any operation before 2020, but Czech railway infrastructure manager (Správa železnic) has a special budget for preparatory studies. There is also promotion from side of NGOs, e.g. Centrum pro Efektivní Dopravu

Both the Czech Republic and the German state of Saxony have expressed interest in a high-speed line linking Dresden and Prague via Ústí nad Labem. The line would include a tunnel through the Ore Mountains and relieve the congested Dresden Děčin Railway through the Elbe valley, which as of 2016 was the only electrified line linking Germany and the Czech Republic and serves as an important freight link to the North Sea ports. However, the proposal for the Bundesverkehrswegeplan 2015 (federal transportation plan) which lays out German transportation priorities until 2030 does not include the line in its highest priority category, making construction unlikely in the near term.

Hungary 
In September 2022 the Hungarian Government has announced the purchase of 39 + 10 trains (composed of 7 carriages each) and 50 Siemens Vectron locomotives with the purpose of upgrading up to 2/3 of the existing long-distance passenger fleet running on domestic and international InterCity services of the Hungarian State Railways. The project foresees services similar to those provided by ÖBB's railjet services running in Austria as well as abroad, including between Budapest and Vienna (and forward to Munich or Zurich). The company plans to offer upgraded InterCity services on the following lines:

 Budapest – Miskolc – Nyíregyháza – Szolnok – Budapest loop 
 Budapest – Pécs
 Budapest – Kecskemét – Szeged
 Budapest – Győr – Vienna (together with existing ÖBB railjet services) 
 Budapest – Lake Balaton southern shore 
 Budapest – Lake Balaton northern shore (after the line's electrification) 
 Budapest – Prague 
 Budapest – Warsaw 
 Budapest – Belgrade 
 possible services to the states of the Southern Balkans 

However, currently the highest allowed speed limit in the country remains at 160 km/h on the Budapest – Hegyeshalom (Austrian border) line. 

Furthermore, in January 2022, the Hungarian Government has also announced to conduct a feasibility study on a new high-speed line capable of reaching speeds up to 250 - 300 km/h between Budapest and Cluj-Napoca, Transylvania, Romania.

Ireland

Poland

Today, the main cities of Poland are linked by railway transport reaching . On 14 December 2014, Polish State Railways started passenger service trains PKP Pendolino ED250 operating  speed on  line Olszamowice-Zawiercie (part of railway line called Central Trunk Line (CMK) from Warsaw to Katowice). Currently it is the line with highest railway speed in Poland. According to recent plans of PKP-PLK, sections of CMK between Warsaw and Gdańsk and Warsaw-Kraków (additional ) will be added to present section from no later than December 2015.

Polish Railways planned to buy Pendolino trains in 1998, but the contract was cancelled the following year by the Supreme Control Chamber due to financial losses by Polish Railways. However, a new contract with Alstom Transport worth 665 million euros was signed in May 2011 and since December 2014, 20 Pendolino units service the Katowice/Kraków – Gdynia line and Wrocław/Warsaw line. However, Pendolinos in Poland are not equipped with tilting system, which would not be very useful on the flat Polish Plains. The lack of a tilting system for the Pendolino train along with choosing Alstom Transportation despite domestic train producers was a subject of broad debate in media and Polish Railways were heavily criticised for that purchase.

Other current plans call for a 'Y' line that will connect Warsaw, Łódź and Kalisz, with branches to Wrocław and Poznań. Construction was planned to begin around 2014 and finish in 2019. In the centre of the city of Łódź the 'Y' line will travel through a tunnel which will link two existing railway stations. One of them, Łódź Fabryczna, will be reconstructed as an underground station, work being scheduled to start in July 2010. In April 2009, four companies qualified for the second phase of a public tender to prepare a feasibility study for construction of the line.
In April 2010, the tender for a feasibility study was awarded to a consortium led by Spanish company Ingenieria IDOM.
The feasibility study project was granted €80 million in subsidy from European Union. The total cost of the line including construction and train sets was estimated at €6.9bn and is planned to be financed partially by EU subsidies.

In 2019, the program of the Solidarity Transport Hub (STH) or Central Communication/Transport Port (in Polish Centralny Port Komunikacyjny or CPK) was announced by the Polish government. This project enivsages the construction of 2,000 km of high-speed railways as well as upgrades to 3,700 km of existing railways to connect the largest urban areas in Poland and surrounding countries. A new airport in central Poland will serve as the main transport hub for the entire country, with travel time by rail of under 2.5 hours to nearly all major Polish cities. The network will also connect Poland to the planned high-speed railway network of the Czech Republic and to Rail Baltica.

Portugal

High-speed connections between Spain and Portugal have been agreed upon and planned, but initial works had yet to begin when the projects were cancelled in 2012.

On 8 May 2010, The Portuguese Transport Minister signed off the 40-year PPP covering the construction of the Lisbon–Madrid high-speed line. The total cost was then put at €1.359bn for a double-track standard gauge line from Lisbon to the Spanish border. Also included was a broad gauge line from the Portuguese Port of Sines to the Spanish border. The line was expected to open by the end of 2013 and would reduce the journey time between Lisbon and Madrid to 2 hours 45 minutes, the project however, was cancelled in March 2012. 
In October 2020 the government proposed a 75-minute rail link between the country's two main cities, Lisbon and Porto. Also, the Atlantic Axis of the Northwestern Peninsula – Eixo Atlântico do Noroeste Peninsular high-speed railway connection between Portugal and Galicia (covering all the main cities between Setúbal-Vigo) was favoured as of 2020.

Russia

Two experimental high-speed trainsets (designed for  operation) were built in 1974: locomotive-hauled RT-200 ("Russkaya Troika") and ER-200 EMU. The RT-200 set made only experimental runs in 1975 and 1980 and was discontinued due to unavailability of the ChS-200 high-speed locomotive – they were only delivered later. The ER-200 EMU was put into regular service in 1984. In 1992 a second ER-200 trainset was built in Riga. Both sets were in operation till 28 February 2009.

Instead of these outdated domestic trainsets, imported trainsets have been in operation since March 2009.

In February 2010 RZhD announced it would shortly release a proposal for a new high-speed line to be built parallel to the existing line between Saint Petersburg and Moscow due to congestion on the existing line. It is expected the line to include stops at both Saint Petersburg and Moscow region airports. On 28 January 2011, Russia announced that the high speed rail link between Moscow and Saint Petersburg will be finished on time for the 2018 FIFA World Cup. The cost is expected to be "somewhere around" 10 to 15 billion euros, not including land purchases, said Denis Muratov, general director of High-Speed Rail Lines. The state will shoulder up to 70 percent of construction costs, with the remainder coming from outside investors. Most of that money is likely to come from international financial institutions, including the World Bank and the European Bank for Reconstruction and Development, Muratov said. Sberbank, VTB and VEB may also be interested. In fact, construction of this new Moscow–Saint Petersburg high-speed line didn't start.

The cost of the Moscow–Kazan link is estimated at $21.4 billion. Train travel from Moscow to Kazan, the capital of the Republic of Tatarstan, will be shortened to just 3.5 hours instead of the more than 14 hours that it takes now. The opening date was later changed to 2020.

In development

Cross border

Country-specific

See also
 Rail transport in Europe
 Trans-European high-speed rail network

References

External links

 Rail Turkey photo report: High Speed Trains in Europe by P. Trippi, Switzerland